Mézières may refer to:

People 
 Alfred Jean François Mézières (1826–1915), French journalist, politician and historian of literature
 Jean-Claude Mézières (1938-2022), French comic book artist
 Rob De Mezieres, South African writer and director
 Nicolas Le Camus de Mézières (1721–1789), French architect and theoretician
 Philippe de Mézières (1327–1405), French soldier and author
 Eleanor Oglethorpe de Mezieres (1684–1775), an English Jacobite who settled in France after James II was deposed in the Glorious Revolution of 1688

Places 
 Mézières, Ardennes, commune and chef-lieu of the Ardennes department of northern France, to be merged in 1965 with Charleville to form Charleville-Mézières
 Mézières, Fribourg, municipality of the canton of Fribourg, Switzerland
 Mézières Castle, a castle in the municipality of Mézières of the Canton of Fribourg in Switzerland. It is a Swiss heritage site of national significance
 Mézières, Vaud, municipality of the canton of Vaud, Switzerland
 Charleville-Mézières, a commune in northern France, chef-lieu of the Ardennes department in the Champagne-Ardenne region
 Arrondissement of Charleville-Mézières, an arrondissement of France in the Ardennes department in the Champagne-Ardenne region
 Gare de Charleville-Mézières, a railway station serving the town Charleville-Mézières, Ardennes department, northeastern France
 Mézières-au-Perche, a commune in the Eure-et-Loir department in northern France
 Mézières-en-Brenne, a commune in the Indre department in central France
 Mézières-en-Drouais, a commune in the Eure-et-Loir department in northern France
 Mézières-en-Gâtinais, a commune in the Loiret department in north-central France
 Mézières-en-Santerre, a commune in the Somme department in Picardie in northern France
 Mézières-en-Vexin, a commune in the Eure department and Haute-Normandie region of France
 Mézières-lez-Cléry, a commune in the Loiret department in north-central France
 Mézières-sous-Lavardin, a commune in the Sarthe department in the region of Pays-de-la-Loire in north-western France
 Mézières-sur-Couesnon, a commune in the Ille-et-Vilaine department in Brittany in northwestern France
 Mézières-sur-Issoire (Masères), a commune in the Haute-Vienne department in the Limousin region in west-central France
 Mézières-sur-Oise, a commune in the Aisne department in Picardy in northern France
 Mézières-sur-Ponthouin, a commune in the Sarthe department in the region of Pays-de-la-Loire in north-western France
 Mézières-sur-Seine, a commune in the Yvelines department in the Île-de-France in north-central France
 Prix-lès-Mézières, a commune in the Ardennes department in northern France
 Séry-lès-Mézières, a commune in the Aisne department in Picardy in northern France

Other 
 AS Prix-lès-Mézières, a French football club based in Prix-lès-Mézières in the Champagne-Ardenne region in northern France
 Siege of Mézières (1521), during the Italian War of 1521–1526